The Newfoundland Insectarium is a museum insectarium located in Reidville, Newfoundland and Labrador, Canada. The main display features a wide variety of mounted insects from around the world, organized by geographical region. One exhibit covers the insects of  Newfoundland and Labrador. Live arthropods are dispersed around the mounted displays, including tarantulas, scorpions, and cockroaches. The museum also includes a glass beehive with live honeybees, a leafcutter ant colony, a recently extended  butterfly house and a walking trail.

The Newfoundland Insectarium was founded by Lloyd Hollett and Gary Holloway and opened in 1998. Lloyd Hollett is now the primary owner and director. Hollett and his wife now run the Insectarium along with seasonal student employees from May to October yearly. It is located along Route 430 on the road to Gros Morne National Park, and as of July 1, 2011 has received over 250,000 visitors. The building itself was formerly a dairy barn, and was originally built in 1946. The original cedar frame is still in place.

In 2014 the Newfoundland Insectarium was named the best indoor attraction in Newfoundland by TripAdvisor.

References

External links
Official website

Insectariums
Museums in Newfoundland and Labrador
Natural history museums in Canada